Kearyn Byron Baccus (born 5 September 1991) is a footballer who plays as a central midfielder for Macarthur FC in the A-League Men. Born in South Africa, he is a youth international for Australia.

Club career
Baccus joined Sydney FC's youth set-up in 2008, and in 2010 moved to Europe where he joined French side Le Mans' youth set-up, not before trialling at Mallorca and Real Sociedad in Spain. In 2012, Baccus joined A-League club Perth Glory on a short-term deal prior to his impending move to Italian outfit Siena. Though after a disappointing spell in Perth, due to injury and lack of fitness, Baccus chose to move back to Sydney, where he joined local side Blacktown City.

On 6 November 2014, Baccus joined Western Sydney Wanderers on an injury-replacement contract, followed by signing a deal to play in the 2015 Asian Champions League before becoming a full squad member for Seasons 2015–16 and 2016–17. In October 2018, Baccus signed with Melbourne City FC as an injury replacement player.

On 5 July 2019 he signed a three-year deal with South African side Kaizer Chiefs.

On 6 July 2022 he was announced to be playing for Australian A-League side Macarthur FC.

Personal life
Baccus was born in South Africa, and moved to Australia at a young age. He is the older brother of St Mirren FC player Keanu Baccus.

Honours
Macarthur
Australia Cup: 2022

References

External links
 

1991 births
Living people
Soccer players from Durban
Soccer players from Sydney
Association football defenders
Australian soccer players
Australia youth international soccer players
South African soccer players
South African emigrants to Australia
Western Sydney Wanderers FC players
Sydney FC players
Melbourne City FC players
Kaizer Chiefs F.C. players
Macarthur FC players
A-League Men players
National Premier Leagues players
Le Mans FC players
Perth Glory FC players
Blacktown City FC players
South African Premier Division players
Australian people of South African descent